Igor Rakočević (born 29 March 1978) is a Serbian professional basketball executive and former player.

At a height of 1.94 m (6'4 ") tall, he played at both the point guard and shooting guard positions, but he spent the vast majority of his career playing as a shooting guard. During his playing career, Rakočević was a two-time All-EuroLeague Team member, and a three-time Alphonso Ford EuroLeague Top Scorer Trophy winner. He was also a member of the senior FR Yugoslavian national team, which was eventually renamed the Serbian and Montenegrin national team. With FR Yugoslavia, he won gold medals at both the 2001 FIBA EuroBasket and the 2002 FIBA World Championship.

Professional career

Early years
Rakočević played with Crvena zvezda and Budućnost before going to the NBA. With Crvena zvezda, he won the YUBA League championship in the 1997–98 season, and finished second in the FIBA Korać Cup in the same season.

In 2000, after getting drafted in the NBA, he signed a three-year contract with KK Budućnost, with an NBA exit clause along with a set transfer fee should he decide to exercise the clause.

Minnesota Timberwolves
Rakočević was selected by the Minnesota Timberwolves, in the 2nd round (51st overall) of the 2000 NBA Draft. He did not play in the NBA, until the 2002–03 NBA season, in which he totaled 244 minutes of playing time, in 42 games played, and averaged 1.9 points, 0.8 assists, and 0.4 rebounds per game. He was released after the season, and signed by the San Antonio Spurs, who also released him shortly after. The 2002 - 2003 season ended up being his only season in the NBA, with his final game being a 97 - 78 win over the Portland Trail Blazers on April 6th, 2003. In his final game, Rakočević played for 1 minute and recorded 1 assist and no other stats.

Back to Europe
In October 2003, Rakočević returned to Europe, and signed with Crvena zvezda, where he was the top scorer of the Adriatic League. He was the captain and best player of Crvena zvezda in that 2003–04 season.

He continued his career in Spain, where he played with Pamesa Valencia, Real Madrid and Tau Cerámica. In the EuroLeague 2006–07 season, he won the Alphonso Ford EuroLeague Top Scorer Trophy. He was also selected to the All-EuroLeague Second Team of that year's competition. With TAU Cerámica, Rakočević won the Spanish Supercup title in 2006, 2007, and 2008, the Spanish King's Cup title in 2009, and the Spanish ACB League championship in 2008. He also won another Alphonso Ford Top Scorer Trophy with TAU, in 2009.

In June 2009, he signed a three-year contract with the Turkish Super League club Efes Pilsen. While playing with Efes, he also won the 2011 Alphonso Ford Top Scorer Trophy. In June 2011, he left Efes.

In October 2011, Rakočević signed with the Italian League club Montepaschi Siena, for the 2011–12 season.

On 9 August 2012, he signed a two-year contract with Crvena zvezda, which began his third stint with that team. In July 2013, Rakočević decided not to play for Crvena zvezda in the following season, and he made the statement that he would play abroad for one more season, or would retire, and become the sports director of the team.

National team career
Rakočević made his debut with the senior FR Yugoslavian national team at the 2000 Summer Olympic Games. After that, he played at the 2001 EuroBasket, in Turkey (where he won a gold medal), and at the 2005 EuroBasket, in Serbia and Montenegro. He was a member of the FR Yugoslavia team that became the FIBA World Champions in Indianapolis, at the 2002 FIBA World Championship, and he was the captain of the Serbia and Montenegro national team in Japan, at the 2006 FIBA World Championship. He also played at the 2004 Athens Summer Olympic Games.

Post-playing career 
In February 2015, Rakočević was elected as the vice-president of the Basketball Federation of Serbia, and put in charge of men's basketball. In December 2020, he was not sought for re-election.

Rakočević was elected on 5-year term as a member of the Assembly of the KK Crvena zvezda on 27 December 2021.

Personal life
Rakočević is the son of former Serbian basketball player Goran Rakočević, who played at the point guard position with Crvena zvezda.

Since retiring from professional basketball, Rakočević has taken up Brazilian Jiu-Jitsu and in December 2021 was promoted to black belt in the art after a little over nine years of training.

Career statistics

EuroLeague

|-
| style="text-align:left;"| 2000–01
| style="text-align:left;" rowspan=2| Budućnost
| 11 || 10 || 29.8 || .417 || .222 || .653 || 2.7 || 1.8 || 1.4 || .0 || 12.9 || 9.8
|-
| style="text-align:left;"| 2001–02
| 14 || 12 || 29.6 || .480 || .345 || .655 || 1.6 || 2.1 || 1.3 || .0 || 17.7 || 14.8
|-
| style="text-align:left;"| 2005–06
| style="text-align:left;"| Real Madrid
| 20 || 9 || 27.2 || .443 || .402 || .893 || 2.9 || 3.0 || .8 || .0 ||14.8 || 14.2
|-
| style="text-align:left;"| 2006–07
| style="text-align:left;" rowspan=3| TAU Cerámica
| 22 || 20 || 27.2 || .492 || .475 || .843 || 2.4 || 1.7 || 1.4 || .1 || style="background:#cfecec;"|16.2 || 14.4
|-
| style="text-align:left;"| 2007–08
| 22 || 22 || 27.8 || .465 || .396 || .837 || 2.3 || 1.7 || .7 || .0 || 14.9 || 12.7
|-
| style="text-align:left;"| 2008–09
| 21 || 21 || 26.5 || .460 || .398 || .895 || 2.3 || 2.0 || .8 || .0 || style="background:#cfecec;"| 18.0 || 16.8
|-
| style="text-align:left;"| 2009–10
| style="text-align:left;" rowspan=2| Efes Pilsen
| 16 || 5 || 20.1 || .353 || .286 || .833 || 1.7 || 2.3 || .4 || .0 || 10.0 || 9.1
|-
| style="text-align:left;"| 2010–11
| 14 || 14 || 29.9 || .457 || .435 || .877 || 2.3 || 1.7 || .7 || .0 || style="background:#cfecec;"| 17.2 || 15.0
|-
| style="text-align:left;"| 2011–12
| style="text-align:left;"| Montepaschi
| 19 || 5 || 19.7 || .399 || .455 || .780 || 1.9 || 1.6 || .3 || .1 || 9.4 || 7.0
|- class="sortbottom"
| style="text-align:left;"| Career
| style="text-align:left;"|
| 159 || 118 || 26.3 || .449 || .384 || .816 || 2.3 || 2.0 || .8 || .0 || 14.6 || 12.8

NBA

Regular season

|-
| style="text-align:left;"| 2002–03
| style="text-align:left;"| Minnesota
| 42 || 0 || 5.8 || .379 || .417 || .806 || .4 || .8 || .1 || .0 || 1.9
|- class="sortbottom"
| style="text-align:left;"| Career
| style="text-align:left;"|
| 42 || 0 || 5.8 || .379 || .417 || .806 || .4 || .8 || .1 || .0 || 1.9

Awards and accomplishments

Pro career
Crvena zvezda Belgrade
 FR Yugoslav League (1): 1998
 Serbian Radivoj Korać Cup (2): 2004, 2013
Budućnost Podgorica
 FR Yugoslav League (1): 2001
 FR Yugoslav Cup (1): 2001
Valencia Basket
 Valencian League (1): 2005
Real Madrid
 Community of Madrid Tournament (1): 2006
TAU Cerámica
 Spanish League (1): 2008
 Spanish Cup (1): 2009
 Spanish Supercup (3): 2006, 2007, 2008
Efes Istanbul
 Turkish Super Cup (2): 2009, 2010
Montepaschi Siena
 Italian League (1): 2012
 Italian Cup (1): 2012

Individual
 FR Yugoslavian League Most Improved Player: (1998)
 Adriatic League Final Four Top Scorer: (2004)
 Adriatic League Top Scorer: (2004)
 Spanish ACB League 3 Point Shootout Champion: (2007–08)
 3× Alphonso Ford EuroLeague Top Scorer Trophy: 2007, 2009, 2011
 All-EuroLeague Second Team: (2007)
 All-EuroLeague First Team: (2009)
 Spanish League Top Scorer: (2009)
 All-Spanish League Team: (2009)

FR Yugoslavian junior national team
 1996 FIBA Europe Under-18 Championship: 
 1997 Nike Hoop Summit
 1997 FIBA Under-21 World Cup: 
 1998 FIBA Europe Under-20 Championship: 
 1998 FIBA Europe Under-20 Championship: MVP

FR Yugoslavian senior national team
 1997 Mediterranean Games: 
 2001 EuroBasket: 
 2002 FIBA World Championship:

See also
 List of father-and-son combinations who have played for Crvena zvezda
 KK Crvena zvezda accomplishments and records
 List of Brazilian jiu-jitsu practitioners
 List of Serbian NBA players

References and notes

External links

 
 Igor Rakočević at acb.com 
 Igor Rakočević at draftexpress.com
 Igor Rakočević at euroleague.net
 Igor Rakočević at fiba.com
 Igor Rakočević at fibaeurope.com
 Igor Rakočević at legabasket.it 
 Igor Rakočević at tblstat.net
 

1978 births
Living people
2002 FIBA World Championship players
2006 FIBA World Championship players
ABA League players
Anadolu Efes S.K. players
Basketball executives
Basketball League of Serbia players
Basketball players at the 2000 Summer Olympics
Basketball players at the 2004 Summer Olympics
Basketball players from Belgrade
Competitors at the 1997 Mediterranean Games
FIBA EuroBasket-winning players
FIBA World Championship-winning players
KK Budućnost players
KK Crvena zvezda players
Liga ACB players
Mediterranean Games bronze medalists for Yugoslavia
Mediterranean Games medalists in basketball
Mens Sana Basket players
Members of the Assembly of KK Crvena zvezda
Minnesota Timberwolves draft picks
Minnesota Timberwolves players
National Basketball Association players from Serbia
Olympic basketball players of Serbia and Montenegro
Olympic basketball players of Yugoslavia
Point guards
Real Madrid Baloncesto players
Saski Baskonia players
Serbian basketball executives and administrators
Serbian expatriate basketball people in Montenegro
Serbian expatriate basketball people in Italy
Serbian expatriate basketball people in Spain
Serbian expatriate basketball people in Turkey
Serbian expatriate basketball people in the United States
Serbian men's basketball players
Shooting guards
Valencia Basket players